East Los Angeles College (ELAC) is a public community college in Monterey Park, California, a suburb of Los Angeles. It is part of the California Community Colleges System and the Los Angeles Community College District. With fourteen communities comprising its primary service area and an enrollment of 35,403 students, ELAC had the largest student body campus by enrollment in the state of California as of 2018. It was located in northeastern East Los Angeles before that part of unincorporated East Los Angeles was annexed by Monterey Park in the early 1970s.  ELAC offers associate degrees and certificates.

History

At the end of World War II Los Angeles needed another city college to accommodate the vast numbers of servicemen returning from deployment. Los Angeles City College (LACC) was the first city college to service Los Angeles and by the end of World War II was still the only city college in the area. Transportation was limited and costly, lowering the number of students able to attend LACC while at the same time the Eastside was rapidly developing into the city’s industrial center. Arthur Baum, editor of the East Los Angeles Tribune, headed a citizen's committee—-a group of presidents of all clubs and organizations in the community—-including Principal D. Raymond Brothers of Garfield High School, County Supervisor Smith, Superintendent Kersey and various industrial leaders. The group presented the proposition of a Junior College to the Los Angeles City Board of Education in a special meeting on March 1, 1945. The Los Angeles Board of Education voted to establish a Junior College on the Garfield High School campus. The Los Angeles City Board of Education established East Los Angeles College in June 1945, making it just the second city college (or junior college) serving the Los Angeles area. The college opened for classes on September 4, 1945 on the campus of Garfield High School with an enrollment of 373 students and 19 faculty, although the school board authorized a faculty of 25, selected from the faculty of LACC. 107 students attended college classes at Garfield, while 266 attended at L.A. County Hospital in health careers, primarily nursing. The junior college was part of the Los Angeles City Public Schools system (L.A. Unified School District today).

On September 19, 1945, the first edition of the Campus News (temporary paper) of the college was issued, while on September 25 a constitution for the Junior College was adopted and presented at an assembly. The college would have to deal with the overwhelming numbers of returning servicemen (veterans) enrolling using the G.I. Bill. About 50,000 men were being discharged in the state every month.

The college was moved to its present  site on Avenida Cesar Chavez in February 1948. The college is located six miles from the Los Angeles Civic Center. 
A part of the 2005 Goal! movie was filmed at the ELAC Weingart Stadium. The ELAC men's basketball team is featured in the Netflix series Last Chance U: Basketball, a spin-off series of Last Chance U, which aired on March 10, 2021.

East Los Angeles College will offer the state's first community college program in Central American studies.

College presidents

South Gate Campus
The East Los Angeles College (ELAC) South Gate Campus is an extension of East Los Angeles College. South Gate campus was created to extend East Los Angeles College's academic services to the southeast corridor of Los Angeles. Construction of a new South Gate campus started in 2019 on the former site of Firestone Tire and Rubber Co. It is expected to open in fall 2022. On March 22, 2021, the California Community Colleges Board of Governors approved the South Gate Campus as an official "education center".

Theater and arts
ELAC is home to the Vincent Price Art Museum, a contemporary art museum named in honor of American actor and art collector Vincent Price. In 1957, impressed by the spirit of the students and the community's need for the opportunity to experience original art works first hand, Vincent and Mary Grant Price donated 90 pieces from their private collection to establish the museum, which was the first "teaching art collection" owned by a community college in the United States. The Price family ultimately donated 2,000 pieces over the course of their lifetimes and the museum's permanent collection now contains over 9,000 pieces valued in excess of $5 million.

In 1974, Roberto Esteban Chavez painted The Path to Knowledge and the False University, a 200-foot mural on the East Los Angeles Community College campus, where he worked as an arts educator and chair of the Chicano Studies department. Although the mural was destroyed by the college, the mural, its impact and the political questions surrounding the destruction were detailed in two museum exhibits: "Roberto Chavez and The False University: A Retrospective" at the Vincent Price Museum and "Murales Rebeldes: L.A. Chicana/o Murals under Siege" Pacific Standard Time: LA/LA Beyond Borders in 2017.

Student life

The school uses a semester-based academic year. The student-faculty ratio is 34-to-1. The in-state tuition and fees for 2017–2018 were $1,220, and out-of-state tuition and fees were $7,746. There is no application fee. As of fall 2018 the total enrollment at ELAC was 35,403. Full-time enrollment 7,810 and Part-time enrollment 27,593. Total entering students for fall 2017 was 34,697 full-time 8,538 and part time was 26,569.

Popular programs include: Social Sciences, Homeland Security, Law Enforcement, Firefighting and Related Protective Services, and Business, Management, Marketing, and Related Support Services.

Honors Program

The East Los Angeles Honors Program, which is recognized by the UC system, the Claremont Colleges, Occidental College and Loyola Marymount, offers rigorous courses that are designed to help students transfer and successfully transition to four-year universities. The Honors Program is open to both part and full-time students and requires a 3.0 GPA to apply and be considered for enrollment. Successful completion of the Honors Program guarantees priority consideration for admission at 11 four-year universities throughout California and Washington.

Rankings
In 2016 the school ranked 13th for Best 2-Year College for adult learners under America's Best Colleges for Adult Learners by Washington Monthly. In 2019 it was ranked number 1 in California and number 6 in the nation in awarding degrees and certificates to Hispanic Students, according to Hispanic outlook on education Magazine.

Activity with area high school

ELAC's football field at the Weingart Stadium the site of graduation ceremonies for local high schools such as Garfield High School in East Los Angeles. It has also hosted the "East L.A. Classic" football game between Garfield against Theodore Roosevelt High School, that traditionally draws over 20,000 fans.
In 2016 even U.S. Senate candidate congresswoman Loretta Sanchez was in attendance.

First-time director Billy McMillin's film documentary The Classic about the football game won the 2017 storytelling award from the LA Film Festival.

Notable alumni

 Antonio Villaraigosa, former Mayor of Los Angeles
 Esteban Edward Torres, former United States Ambassador to UNESCO, Special Assistant to President Jimmy Carter, and U.S. Congress Member
 Art Torres, California Democratic Party chairman
 Ruben Salazar, former reporter for the Los Angeles Times
 Gloria Molina, Los Angeles County Supervisor
 Luis J. Rodriguez, poet, novelist, journalist, critic, columnist, and Los Angeles Poet Laureate
 Ruben Quesada, poet, editor, board member at the National Book Critics Circle
 Edward James Olmos, actor
 Leroy D. Baca, former Sheriff of Los Angeles
 Raymond Cruz, actor 
 Julian Nava, former U.S. Ambassador to Mexico, writer
 Bob Pacheco, former 60th District Assemblyman
 Richard Polanco, former California State Senate Majority leader and member of the California State Assembly
 Susan Rubio, Member of the California State Senate from the 22nd
 Mike Fong, California State Assembly from the 49th district
 Katrina Dimaranan, beauty queen, actress, host, Binibining Pilipinas-Tousim 2012, Miss Supranational USA 2018, Miss Supranational 2018 1st runner-up
 Kent Twitchell, muralist
 Alexander Salazar auxiliary bishop of the Archdiocese of Los Angeles from 2004 to 2018.
 Ben Davidson, former Oakland Raider
 Clarence Davis, retired NFL football player
 Antoinette Harris, football player
 Ethan Katz (born 1983), pitching coach for the San Francisco Giants
 Sylvia Mosqueda, long-distance runner
 Dennis Sanchez, founder of East Side Spirit and Pride

Faculty
Judy Chu an American politician serving as a U.S. Representative

See also

 Howard E. Dorsey, Los Angeles City Council member, 1937, supported establishing new college in East Los Angeles

Notes

References

External links
 Official website

California Community Colleges
Universities and colleges in Los Angeles County, California
Two-year colleges in the United States
Eastside Los Angeles
Monterey Park, California
Schools accredited by the Western Association of Schools and Colleges
1945 establishments in California
Educational institutions established in 1945
Education in Los Angeles County, California